Gurmukh Nihal Singh (14 March 1895 – 22 December 1969) was the first Governor of Rajasthan and second Chief Minister of Delhi from 1955 to 1956 and was a Congress leader. He was the successor of Chaudhary Brahm Prakash and assumed office in 1955 just for one year.
The late journalist Surendra Nihal Singh (1929-2018) was Gurmukh Nihal Singh's son.

Notes

References 

1895 births
Year of death missing
Governors of Rajasthan
Chief Ministers of Delhi
Speakers of the Delhi Legislative Assembly
Indian National Congress politicians
Chief ministers from Indian National Congress
1969 deaths